Josef Kaczor (born 23 March 1953) is a retired German football striker.

References

External links
 

1953 births
Living people
Sportspeople from Hamm
German footballers
VfL Bochum players
Feyenoord players
Eintracht Frankfurt players
Bundesliga players
Eredivisie players
Expatriate footballers in the Netherlands
German expatriates in the Netherlands
Hammer SpVg players
Association football forwards
Footballers from North Rhine-Westphalia
20th-century German people